Henry King may refer to:

People

 Henry King (poet) (1592–1669), English poet, Bishop of Chichester
 Sir Henry King, 3rd Baronet (1681–1740), Anglo-Irish politician
 Henry King (fl. 1699), English pirate captain
 Henry King (died 1821) (1733–1821), Anglo-Irish politician
 Henry King (British Army officer) (1776–1839), Member of Parliament for County Sligo
 Henry King (congressman) (1790–1861), U.S. Representative from Pennsylvania
 Henry W. King (1815–1857), Free Soil politician in the U.S. state of Ohio 
 H. R. King (Henry R. King, 1820s-1903), British trade union leader
 Henry King (police officer) (1832–?), Chief of Police in Los Angeles, California, 1878–1880, 1881–1883
 Henry Edward King (1832–1910), politician in colonial Queensland, Speaker of the Legislative Assembly
 Seymour King (Henry Seymour King, 1852–1933), English banker, mountaineer and Conservative Member of Parliament
 Henry Churchill King (1858–1934), theologian and educator; served on King-Crane Commission

 Henry King (photographer) (c. 1855–1923), English-born Australian photographer
 Harry King (footballer) (1886–1968), English football (soccer) player
 Henry King (director) (1886–1982), American film director
 Henry King (musician) (1906–1974), American orchestra leader and pianist
 Henry C. King (1915–2005), astronomer and writer
 Henry T. King (1919–2009), prosecutor at the Nuremberg Trials

Other
 "Henry King, Who chewed bits of string and was early cut off in dreadful agonies", poem by Hilaire Belloc
 Brainwave (comics), a name shared by two DC Comics characters, father and son, supervillain Henry King Sr. and superhero Henry King Jr.

See also 
 For monarchs called King Henry, see with List of rulers named Henry